This is a list of curling clubs in France.

Olympique Glace Club Albertville, Albertville
ASM Belfort Vitesse, Belfort
Besançon Curling Club, Besançon
Bordeaux Sports de Glace, Bordeaux
Chambéry C.S.G. Chambéry
Chamonix Club des Sports, Chamonix
Charleville Mézières S.G., Charleville-Mézières
Contamines Mointjoie, Les Contamines-Montjoie 
Grenoble Isere Metropole Patinage, Crolles
Happy Rolling Stone, Huez 
Sports de Glace Haut Jura, Prémanon
Curling La Garde, La Garde 
Curling Club de Lyon, Lyon
Massilia Curling Club, Allauch 
Megève Club des Sports, Megève
Mulhouse A.S.G., Mulhouse
Association Nice Baies des Anges, Nice
Nice Curling Club, Nice
Pralognan Curling Club, Pralognan-la-Vanoise 
Rouen Olympic Club, Rouen
Curling-Club Saint-Gervais, Saint Gervais-les-Bains
Saint Pierre Curling Club, Saint Pierre and Miquelon
Strasbourg Kleber Curling Club, Ostwald 
Valence Curling, Valence
Pierres de feu Curling Vaujany, Vaujany
Curling Club de Viry-Châtillon, Viry-Châtillon

References

France
Clubs
Curling